UnoAErre Italia is a goldsmith, jewelry and watchmaking company based in Arezzo, Italy. The company manufactures, distributes and exports of gold and jewelry in Italy and abroad.

History
The company was founded on March 15, 1926 by Leopoldo Gori and Carlo Zucchi, in the city of Arezzo, with the idea to apply industrial methodologies to goldsmithing, aiming to minimize the costs of metal work. The name UnoAErre comes from 1AR, the identification mark indicated on the punch affixed to products, assigned to the first goldsmith company of Arezzo (AR).
	
In the sixties production reached the highest levels, and the company employed more than 1200 staff. It began a reduction of its workforce in the early 1970s. Today fewer than 500 are employed. The company passed from the hands of families Gori-Zucchi to Morgenf Enfield (Deutsche Bank Group) in the mid 1990s, and was regained by Zucchi family with the help of a group of banks. Operations were subsequently moved to a new factory. In 2008, the company revisited its practices to manufacture items that are lighter and that contain less gold and expanded into the production of accessories, rather than just sticking to traditional jewelry.

Museum
UnoAErre also operates a museum with works of the artists who have collaborated in the production of its jewelry, including Pietro Cascella, Salvador Dalí and Salvatore Fiume. There's also a section on industrial archaeology.

References

External links

Design companies established in 1926
Italian companies established in 1926
Retail companies of Italy
Jewellery companies of Italy
Watch manufacturing companies of Italy
Companies based in Tuscany
Italian brands